Gerald Wright (born 1942) is a member of the Oklahoma Senate.

Gerald Wright may also refer to:

Gerald Wright (American football referee), see 2012 Chicago Bears season
Gerald Wright, character in The Wright Way

See also
Gearld Wright (1933–2002), American politician
Gerry Wright (disambiguation)